A galley slave was a slave rowing in a galley, either a convicted criminal sentenced to work at the oar (French: galérien), or a kind of human chattel, often a prisoner of war, assigned to the duty of rowing.

In the ancient Mediterranean, galley rowers were mostly free men, and slaves were used as rowers when manpower was in high demand. In medieval and early modern times, convicts and prisoners of war often manned galleys, and the Barbary pirates enslaved captives as galley slaves. During the 18th and 19th centuries, pirates in Asia likewise manned their galleys with captives.

Antiquity 
Ancient navies generally preferred to rely on free men to man their galleys. Slaves were usually not put at the oars except in times of pressing manpower demands or extreme emergency, and in some of these cases they would earn their freedom by this. There is no evidence that ancient navies ever made use of condemned criminals as oarsmen, despite the popular image from novels such as Ben-Hur.

Greek navies 
In Classical Athens, a leading naval power of Classical Greece, rowing was regarded as an honorable profession of which men should possess some practical knowledge, and sailors were viewed as instrumental in safeguarding the state. According to Aristotle, the common people on the rowing benches won the Battle of Salamis, thereby strengthening the Athenian democracy.

The special characteristics of the trireme, with each of its 170 oars being handled by a single oarsman, demanded the commitment of skilled freemen; rowing required coordination and training on which success in combat and the lives of all aboard depended. Also, practical difficulties such as the prevention of desertion or revolt when bivouacking (triremes used to be hauled on land at night) made free labour more secure and more economical than slaves.

In the 5th and 4th centuries BC, Athens generally followed a naval policy of enrolling citizens from the lower classes (thetes), metics (foreigners resident in Athens) and hired foreigners. Although it has been argued that slaves formed part of the rowing crew in the Sicilian Expedition, a typical Athenian trireme crew during the Peloponnesian War consisted of 80 citizens, 60 metics and 60 foreign hands.

However, when put under military pressure by the Spartans in the final stages of the conflict, Athens, in an all-out effort, mobilized all men of military age, including all slaves. After the victorious Battle of Arginusae, the freed slaves were even given Athenian citizenship, in a move interpreted as an attempt to keep them motivated rowing for Athens. On two other occasions during the war, captured enemy galley slaves were given freedom by the victors.

In Sicily, the tyrant Dionysios (ca. 432–367 BC) once set all slaves of Syracuse free to man his galleys, employing thus freedmen, but otherwise relied on citizens and foreigners as oarsmen.

Slaves accompanying officers and hoplite marines as personal attendants into war are assumed by modern scholars to have also assisted in the rowing when need arose, but there is no definite proof on this point, and they should not be regarded as regular members of the crew. When travelling over the sea on personal matters, it was common that both master and slave pulled the oar.

Roman and Carthaginian navies 

In Roman times, reliance on rowers of free status continued. Slaves were usually not put at the oars, except in times of pressing manpower demands or extreme emergency.

Thus, in the drawn-out Second Punic War with Carthage, both navies are known to have resorted to slave labour. In the aftermath of Cannae, a levy of slaves was equipped and trained by private Roman individuals for Titus Otacilius’ squadron in Sicily (214 BC). After the capture of New Carthage five years later, local slaves were impressed by Scipio in his fleet on the promise of freedom after the war to those who showed good will as rowers. At the end of the war, Carthage, alarmed over the impending invasion by Scipio, bought five thousand slaves to row its fleet (205 BC). It has been suggested that the introduction of polyremes at the time, particularly of the quinquereme, facilitated the use of little-trained labour, as these warships needed a skilled man only for the position nearest the loom (middle part of the oar), while the remaining rowers at the oar followed his lead.

Nonetheless, the Romans seemed to avoid the use of slave rowers in their subsequent wars with the Hellenistic east. Livy records that naval levies in the War against Antiochos consisted of freedmen and colonists (191 BC), while in the Third Macedonian War (171 BC–168 BC) Rome's fleet was manned by freedmen with Roman citizenship and allies. In the final showdown of the civil war between Octavian and Sextus Pompey, the adversaries enlisted among others slaves, but set them free before putting them to the oars, indicating that the prospect of freedom was judged instrumental in keeping the rowers motivated. In Imperial times, provincials who were free men became the mainstay of the Roman rowing force.

Early modern era

Europe

Only in the Late Middle Ages did slaves begin to be increasingly employed as rowers. It also became the custom among the Mediterranean powers to sentence condemned criminals to row in the war-galleys of the state (initially only in time of war). Traces of this practice appear in France as early as 1532, but the first legislative enactment comes in the Ordonnance d'Orléans of 1561. In 1564 Charles IX of France forbade the sentencing of prisoners to the galleys for fewer than ten years. A brand of the letters GAL identified the condemned galley-slaves.

Naval forces from both Christian and Muslim countries often turned prisoners of war into galley-slaves. Thus, at the Battle of Lepanto in 1571, 12,000 Christian galley slaves were freed from the Ottoman Turks.

The Knights Hospitaller made use of galley slaves and debtors to row their galleys during their rule over the Maltese Islands.

In 1622, Saint Vincent de Paul, as a former slave himself (in Tunis), became chaplain to the galleys and ministered to the galley slaves.

In 1687 the governor of New France, Jacques-René de Brisay de Denonville, seized, chained, and shipped 50 Iroquois chiefs from Fort Frontenac to Marseille, France, to be used as galley slaves.

King Louis XIV of France, who wanted a bigger fleet, ordered that the courts should sentence men to the galleys as often as possible, even in times of peace; he even sought to transform the death penalty to sentencing to the galleys for life (and unofficially did so—a letter exists to all French judges, that they should, if possible, sentence men to life in the galleys instead of death).

By the end of the reign of Louis XIV in 1715 the use of the galley for war purposes had practically ceased, but the French Navy did not incorporate the corps of the galleys until 1748. From the reign of Henry IV, Toulon functioned as a naval military port, Marseille having become a merchant port, and served as the headquarters of the galleys and of the convict rowers (galériens). After the incorporation of the galleys, the system sent the majority of these latter to Toulon, the others to Rochefort and to Brest, where they worked in the arsenal.

Convict rowers also went to a large number of other French and non-French cities: Nice, Le Havre, Nîmes, Lorient, Cherbourg, Saint-Vaast-la-Hougue, La Spezia, Antwerp and Civitavecchia; but Toulon, Brest and Rochefort predominated. At Toulon the convicts remained (in chains) on the galleys, which were moored as hulks in the harbour. Their shore prisons had the name bagnes ("baths"), a name given to such penal establishments first by the Italians, and allegedly deriving from the prison at Constantinople situated close by or attached to the great baths there.

The use of the term galérien nevertheless continued until 1873, when the last  in France (as opposed to the bagnes relocated to French Guiana), the bagne of Toulon, closed definitively. In Spain, the word  continued in  use as late as the early 19th century for a criminal condemned to penal servitude. In Italian the word  is still in use for a prison.

A vivid account of the life of galley-slaves in France appears in Jean Marteilhes's Memoirs of a Protestant, translated by Oliver Goldsmith, which describes the experiences of one of the Huguenots who suffered after the revocation of the Edict of Nantes in 1685.

Madame de Sevigne, a revered French author, wrote from Paris on April 10, 1671 (Letter VII): "I went to walk at Vincennes, en Troche* and by the way met with a string of galley-slaves ; 
they were going to Marseilles, and will be there in about a 
month. Nothing could have been surer than this mode of 
conveyance, but another thought came into my head, which 
was to go with them myself. There was one Duval among 
them, who appeared to be a convertible man. You will see 
them when they come in, and I suppose you would have 
been agreeably surprised to have seen me in the midst of 
the crowd of women that accompany them."

Galley-slaves lived in unsavoury conditions, so even though some sentences prescribed a restricted number of years, most rowers would eventually die, even if they survived the conditions, shipwreck and slaughter or torture at the hands of enemies or of pirates. Additionally, nobody ensured that prisoners were freed after completing their sentences. As a result, imprisonment for 10 years could in reality mean imprisonment for life because nobody except the prisoner would either notice or care.

Notable galley slaves in Europe
John Knox
Piet Pieterszoon Hein
Jean Parisot de Valette

Africa
The Barbary pirates of the 16th to 19th centuries used galley slaves, often captured Europeans from Italy or Spain. The Ottoman Sultan in Istanbul also used galley slaves.

Notable galley slaves in North Africa
Miguel de Cervantes

Asia
In Southeast Asia, from the mid-18th to the late-19th centuries, the lanong and garay warships of the Iranun and Banguingui pirates were crewed entirely with male galley slaves captured from previous raids. Conditions were brutal and it was not uncommon for galley slaves to die on voyages from exhaustion. Slaves were kept bound to their stations and were fed poorly. Slaves who mistimed their strokes were caned by overseers. Most of the slaves were Tagalogs, Visayans, and "Malays" (including Bugis, Mandarese, Iban, and Makassar). There were also occasional European and Chinese captives.

In fiction 

A short account of his ten years as a galley-slave is given by the character Farrabesche in "The Village Rector" by Honoré de Balzac. He is sentenced to the galleys as a result of his life as a "chauffeur" (in this case the word refers to a brigand who threatened landowners by roasting them).

In one of his ill-fated adventures, Miguel de Cervantes's Don Quixote  frees a row of prisoners sent to the galleys, including Ginés de Pasamonte. The prisoners, however, beat him. (Cervantes himself had been captured in 1575 and served as a galley slave in Algiers for five years before he was ransomed).

In The Sea Hawk, a 1919 historical fiction novel by Rafael Sabatini, as well as the 1924 film based on the novel, the protagonist, Sir Oliver Tressilian, is sold into galley slavery by a relative.

The Sea Hawk (1940) was originally intended to be a new version of the Sabatini novel, but the studio switched to a story whose protagonist, Geoffrey Thorpe, was loosely based on Sir Francis Drake, although Drake was never a galley slave.  Howard Koch was working on the script when war broke out in Europe, and the final story deliberately draws vivid parallels between Spain and the Nazi Reich. The existence of galley slaves and the misery they endure is set up as a metaphor for life under the Reich. When Thorpe (Errol Flynn) liberates a Spanish vessel full of English captives, the freed men row willingly for home to  "Strike for the Shores of Dover",  the stirring music of score composer Erich Wolfgang Korngold and lyrics by Howard Koch and Jack Scholl. The first verse "Pull on the oars! Freedom is yours! Strike for the shores of Dover!" evoked the recent evacuation from Dunkirk. The sets in the 1940 film appear historically accurate.

In Lew Wallace's novel, Ben-Hur: A Tale of the Christ, Judah is sent to the galleys as a murderer but manages to survive a shipwreck and save the fleet leader, who frees and adopts him. Both films based on the novel—Ben-Hur: A Tale of the Christ (1925) and Ben-Hur (1959)—perpetuate the historically inaccurate image of Roman galley slaves.

In the 1943 epic novel The Long Ships, the protagonist, Orm Tostesson, is captured while raiding in Andalusia and serves as a galley slave for a number of years.

The 1947 French film Monsieur Vincent shows Saint Vincent de Paul taking the place of a weakened slave at his oar.

Steven Saylor's Roma Sub Rosa series (covering a period from  92 B.C. to 44 B.C ) includes a novel Arms of Nemesis, which contains an appalling description of the conditions under which galley slaves lived and worked—assuming that they did exist in Rome at that time (see above).

C. S. Forester wrote of an encounter with Spanish galleys in Mr. Midshipman Hornblower when the becalmed British fleet is attacked off Gibraltar by galleys. The author writes of the stench emanating from these galleys due to each carrying two hundred condemned prisoners chained permanently to the rowing benches.

Patrick O'Brian wrote of encounters with galleys in the Mediterranean in Master and Commander emphasising the galley's speed and manoeuvrability compared to sailing ships when there was little wind.

In Victor Hugo's Les Misérables, Jean Valjean was a galley prisoner, and was in danger of returning to the galleys.  Police inspector Javert's father was also a galley prisoner.

Robert E. Howard transplanted the institute of galley slavery to his mythical Hyborian Age, depicting Conan the Barbarian as organizing a rebellion of galley slaves who kill the crew, take over the ship and make him their captain in one novel (Conan the Conqueror serialized in Weird Tales 1935-1936).

In Ursula K. Le Guin's Earthsea series, multiple references are made to galley slaves; in The Farthest Shore specifically, Prince Arren is rescued from captivity, and notes the galley slaves imprisoned with him on the ship.

Notes

References

Further reading 
Bamford, Paul W., Fighting ships and prisons : the Mediterranean Galleys of France in the Age of Louis XIV. Cambridge University Press, London. 1974. 
James, Simon (2001), "The Roman Galley Slave: Ben-Hur and the Birth of a Factoid", Public Archaeology 2, 35-49

Obsolete occupations
Nautical terminology
Galley slaves